Dumisa Makalima (born 29 December 1980) is a South African cricketer. He played 55 first-class and 74 List A matches between 1997 and 2009. He was also part of South Africa's squad for the 2000 Under-19 Cricket World Cup.

References

External links
 

1980 births
Living people
South African cricketers
Border cricketers
Eastern Province cricketers
Cricketers from East London, Eastern Cape